Alexander Vargas Blay (born 17 February 1988) is a Danish singer, songwriter and record producer. He was born in Denmark to a Danish-English mother and a Uruguayan father.

Career 

Vargas relocated to London at age 17 to pursue his musical career where he was signed to Geffen Records and formed the band Vagabond. The band toured the UK selling out two headline tours and also performed at the Glastonbury, T in the Park and V music festivals.

On 16 February 2010, Vargas disbanded Vagabond in order to pursue a solo career.

On 12 and 13 October 2013, Vargas performed as a vocalist with trance band Above & Beyond at their acoustic show at the Greek Theater, Los Angeles. He co-wrote and featured on 5 songs from their fourth studio album We Are All We Need, which debuted at No. 1 on the US Dance/Electronic Albums (Billboard) chart, No. 12 on the UK album chart and No. 34 on the US Billboard 200 chart.

In 2014, Vargas signed with Copenhagen Records and started working on material for his forthcoming EP and album with collaborator Tommy Sheen who also performs live with Vargas. The first release on Copenhagen Records was the single "Till Forever Runs Out" followed by "Solid Ground" on 30 March 2015. "Solid Ground" became a viral hit and is included on the EP Giving Up the Ghost released 22 January 2016. The title track however premiered on US music blog Pigeons & Planes on 16 September 2015. The EP peaked at No. 1 on the Danish and Dutch iTunes Album Charts while the feature single, "Shackled Up" made it to No. 1 on the Danish iTunes Singles Chart and No. 4 on the Dutch iTunes Singles Chart.

UK press and blogs have described Alex as "engrossing, poetic and openly emotional, Vargas' soulful approach is winning fans – prepare to become one of them". –Clash Music

Vargas is a BMI writer and is published by Atlas Music Publishing out of New York.

On 16 February 2017, Vargas announced that his second full-length album, Cohere, would be released on 31 March 2017.

He co-wrote Bulgaria's entry in the Eurovision Song Contest 2017. The song called "Beautiful Mess" was performed by Russian-born Kristian Kostov and reached 2nd place, Bulgaria's best ever result.

Discography

Albums

EPs

Singles

Awards and nominations

References

External links 

 

1988 births
Living people
Danish guitarists
Danish people of English descent
Danish people of Uruguayan descent
Danish expatriates in England
People from Hørsholm Municipality
21st-century Danish male singers
21st-century guitarists